Teilifís na Gaeilge is the corporation in charge of operating the Irish language television channels TG4 and Cúla 4; the corporation is a public service broadcaster.

The corporation was created on 1 April 2007 in order to independently manage the TG4 television station which had up to this point been managed by Raidió Teilifís Éireann since 1996 when broadcasting operations commenced. In 1999, it was rebranded as TG4.

The Broadcasting Act 2009 sets out the details of the law that applies to the corporation, including the duties and functions of the board, as well as that of the chairperson of the board and the director general.

External links
 Teilifís na Gaeilge Corparaideach 
 Teilifís na Gaeilge Corporate

Publicly funded broadcasters
State media
State-sponsored bodies of the Republic of Ireland
TG4